Major-General Charles Richard Sackville-West, 6th Earl De La Warr  (13 November 1815 – 23 April 1873), styled Lord West following the untimely death of his elder brother thus between 1850 and 1869, was a British soldier officer, rising to Major-General for the last 8 years of his life. He was a peer for the last  years of his life, as his father died aged 77. After he killed himself, unmarried, the title and main estates including Ashdown Forest and Buckhurst Park, Sussex passed to his brother through whom the title descended.

Early life
Sackville-West was the second son of George Sackville-West, 5th Earl De La Warr, and Lady Elizabeth Sackville, daughter of John Sackville, 3rd Duke of Dorset. He was notably brother of:
George West, Viscount Cantelupe (whom he outlived)
Reginald Sackville, 7th Earl De La Warr (who outlived and inherited the key estates)
Elizabeth Russell, Duchess of Bedford
Mortimer Sackville-West, 1st Baron Sackville, and 
Lionel Sackville-West, 2nd Baron Sackville.

He was educated at Harrow.

Career and death
Sackville-West served in the British Army and was appointed aide-de-camp and military secretary to Sir Hugh Gough in India in 1845. He fought at the Battle of Sobraon in 1846 during the First Anglo-Sikh War. In 1850 he became known by the courtesy title Lord West after the untimely death of his elder brother, Lord Cantelupe who was likewise unmarried.

Promoted to major in 1852 and to lieutenant-colonel in 1855, he served in the Crimean War. He was appointed a Companion of the Order of the Bath in 1855 and an Officer of the Legion of Honour in 1856 and awarded the Order of the Medjidie in 1858. In 1864 he was promoted to major-general. He succeeded his father in the earldom in 1869. In 1871 he was made a Knight Commander of the Order of the Bath (KCB).

Lord Delaware died in April 1873, aged 57, by drowning himself in the Cam. He was unmarried and was succeeded in the earldom by his next-youngest brother, Reginald, Lord Buckhurst.

References and footnotes
Citations

Footnotes

External links

1815 births
1873 deaths
People educated at Harrow School
6
Charles
Knights Commander of the Order of the Bath
Suicides by drowning in England
British politicians who committed suicide
British military personnel who committed suicide
British military personnel of the First Anglo-Sikh War
British Army personnel of the Crimean War
British Army major generals
Royal Scots Fusiliers officers
Officiers of the Légion d'honneur
Recipients of the Order of the Medjidie, 3rd class
1870s suicides